Abraham González de Hermosillo y Casavantes (June 7, 1864 – March 7, 1913) was the provisional and constitutional governor of the Mexican state of Chihuahua during the early period of the Mexican Revolution. He was the political mentor of the revolutionary Pancho Villa, whom he had met and befriended before the revolution.

Family
González was born on his family's estates in Basúchil, in Guerrero Municipality, Chihuahua. He was a member of one of the richest and best-educated families in the state (the González de Hermosillo family was believed to be descended from European nobility). He was educated at the University of Notre Dame, in South Bend, Indiana. His paternal line is from Teocaltiche, Jalisco, belonging to the González de Hermosillo y Gómez Rendón family  with Y-DNA matches with other González de Hermosillo families of Jalisco.

As with Francisco Madero, the scion of one of the richest landowning families in Coahuila and also educated abroad, Abraham González had suffered under the favoritism of Porfirio Díaz's political system. In Chihuahua, the dominant political clique was the Terrazas-Creel family, which had vast land holdings and strong political connections to Díaz. González "was unable to hold out against the competition of the large haciendas, primarily those belonging to the Terrazas-Creel clan." After Madero wrote his book, The Presidential Succession of 1910 and the political movement of elites against Díaz's election grew, González became the head of the Anti-Re-electionist Club in Chihuahua.

Political career
González was one of the main leaders of the Maderista Junta Revolucionaria Mexicana, the movement which opposed the re-election of dictator Porfirio Díaz in 1910. González was president of the Benito Juárez Anti-Re-electionist Club and met with Francisco Madero in Chihuahua. At the time, Madero had not yet chosen his running mate, and when González asked who he preferred, Madero said Francisco Vázquez Gómez. González declared for Vázquez Gómez. When Madero issued his Plan de San Luis Potosí, calling for rebellion against Díaz after the fraudulent 1910 election, he counted on González, among others, to rise up.

During the early phases of the Revolution, González was appointed provisional governor of the State of Chihuahua in October 1910 by Francisco Madero. After the success of the Madero revolution in 1911, González was appointed interim governor in June 1911, pending elections. He was elected governor in his own right in August 1911.

In October 1911, González obtained a leave of absence, approved by the Chihuahua legislature, from the office of governor so that he could serve on Madero's cabinet in Mexico City. On November 6, 1911, he was sworn in as the Minister of Internal Affairs (Secretaría de Gobernación). As one of the Madero cabinet ministers who had served in the revolution against Díaz, González was a target of the conservative press. He served in this capacity until February 1912, when he returned to Chihuahua due to the seriousness of the Pascual Orozco rebellion against Madero. He served as governor of the state until his arrest and murder by officials of the Victoriano Huerta regime in March 1913.

Murder, and hero's reburial
After the assassination of President Francisco Madero and Vice-President José María Pino Suárez during La decena trágica, González was forced to resign from his post as governor and arrested on February 25, 1913, on orders of General Antonio Rábago, a subordinate of Victoriano Huerta. During González's incarceration he was held in the same complex in the Federal Palace of Chihuahua that had housed Miguel Hidalgo y Costilla prior to his execution a century earlier, during the war for Mexico's independence. On 7 March, he was taken aboard a train on the pretense of being transferred to Mexico City. He was then removed from the train and murdered in Bachimba Canyon, about 40 miles (65 km) south of Chihuahua, on direct orders from Huerta, who had been responsible for ordering the murders of Madero and Pino Suárez in order to assume power.

His nephew, Colonel Fernando González y González, along with Pancho Villa, later recovered González's remains and gave him a hero's funeral in the city of Chihuahua. He is buried in the Rotunda of Illustrious Chihuahuans under the Angel of Liberty monument in the Plaza Mayor in Chihuahua City.

References

Further reading
Almada, Francisco R. La revolución en el estado de Chihuahua. 2 vols., Mexico City: Talleres Gráficos de la Nación 1965.
Almada, Francisco R. Vida, Proceso, y Muerte de Abraham González. Mexico City: Talles Gráficos de la Nación 1967.
Beezley, William H. Revolutionary Governor: Abraham González and the Mexican Revolution in Chihuahua, 1909-1913. PhD dissertation, University of Nebraska 1968.
Katz, Friedrich. The Secret War in Mexico. Chicago: University of Chicago Press 1981.
Osorio Zúñiga, Rubén, "Abraham González Casavantes" in Encyclopedia of Mexico, vol. 1, pp. 606–607. Chicago: Fitzroy Dearborn 1997.

External links

 Conmemoran aniversario luctuoso de Abraham González
  Two articles on his life.(Spanish)

1864 births
1913 deaths
1913 murders in North America
Politicians from Chihuahua (state)
Governors of Chihuahua (state)
Mexican revolutionaries
People of the Mexican Revolution
University of Notre Dame alumni
Vice presidents of Mexico
Mexican Secretaries of the Interior
Deaths by firearm in Mexico
Assassinated Mexican politicians
Mexican democracy activists
People murdered in Mexico
20th-century Mexican politicians